The 1993 Superclub competition was the inaugural season of a nationwide association football club competition in New Zealand. It replaced the New Zealand National Soccer League which had run from 1970 to 1992. The 1993 competition was won by Napier City Rovers over West Auckland side Waitakere City.

Structure
The competition was divided into three stages. In the first phase three ten-team regional round-robin leagues were played, with each team playing every other team home and away. The top teams from this stage progressed to a national league; the bottom teams were relegated to lower regional leagues.

The top eight teams (three from the northern and central regions and two from the southern region) then took part in the national league stage, with each team playing every other team once. Finally, the top four teams played a knockout competition to decide the champion. This involved the top two teams from the national league phase playing each other, and third and fourth place also playing each other. The winner of the match between first and second progressed through to the final; the loser of that match met the winner of the other match to decide the other finalist.

Regional leagues

Northern League

Central League

Southern League

National League

League table

Knockout phase

Play-offs

Final

References

New Zealand Superclub League seasons
1
New Zealand